Twin Springs High School is a public high school located in rural Nickelsville, Virginia.

Sports
Twin Springs' mascot is the Titan. Its official colors are red, white, and blue.

Basketball
In 1993, the Twin Springs boys' basketball team won the Division A Virginia state championship.

References

External links
 Official Website

Public high schools in Virginia
Schools in Scott County, Virginia
Educational institutions established in 1968
1968 establishments in Virginia